Hemicrepidius hirtus is a species of click beetle belonging to the family Elateridae.

Description
The body is uniformly metallic black with a slight silvery pubescence (covering of down). The antennae are quite long and along the elytra there are evident ridges. The sides of the pronotum are rounded. The legs are black. Adults can be found from May to mid-August. The larvae develop in decaying wood.

Distribution
This species is widespread in Europe, Asia Minor and Iran.

Habitat

References

External links
Elateridae.com
Elateridae of the British Isles
Biolib

Beetles described in 1784
Beetles of Asia
Beetles of Europe
hirtus